The American Bride is a 1986 Italian romance film written and directed by Giovanni Soldati. It is based on the novel with the same name written by the director's father.

Plot 
Edoardo, a young professor of literature, is married to the Czechoslovak-American Edith, but he betrays her with her sister who is married to the homosexual Sacha.

Cast 
Stefania Sandrelli : Anna
Thommy Berggren : Edoardo
Harvey Keitel : Sacha
Trudie Styler : Edith 
Richard Borg 		
Florence Sheppard	
Mike Metzel		
Giuseppe Cederna		
Giovanni Lombardo Radice

References

External links

1986 films
1980s romance films
Adultery in films
1980s Italian-language films
English-language Italian films
1980s English-language films
1986 multilingual films
Italian multilingual films
1980s Italian films